Jack Sanders (March 10, 1917 – October 26, 1991) was an American football guard who played for four seasons in the National Football League (NFL). After playing college football for SMU, he was drafted by the New York Giants in the 17th round of the 1939 NFL Draft. He played for the Pittsburgh Steelers from 1940 to 1942, before enlisting in the United States Marine Corps during World War II. He fought in the Battle of Iwo Jima as a first lieutenant in March 1945, and had part of his left arm amputated due to injuries sustained from an explosion while testing underwater demolitions. On August 17, 1945, he signed a contract with the Philadelphia Eagles, and became the first World War II disabled veteran to sign an NFL contract. He played in three games for the Eagles in 1945. In the first game of the season, against the Green Bay Packers, the United States Armed Forces paid to send 22,000 amputees to the game to watch Sanders play.

Sanders became the line coach for the Trinity University football team in 1946, but the school did not field a team that season due to budgetary limitations. On October 10, 1947, he was named temporary head coach of the team to allow previous head coach and athletic director Bob Coe to spend more time overseeing the entire athletic department. Sanders resigned as head coach on January 4, 1949, and accepted a position as an assistant superintendent of a construction company.

On August 29, 1966, Sanders announced his application to the NFL in a bid to be awarded the ownership of an expansion New Orleans franchise as the 16th NFL team. He said that if the New Orleans franchise were selected and awarded to him, he would enlist 30,000 minority owners and own 52% of the team himself. He was advised by former Chicago Cardinals, Detroit Lions, and Pittsburgh Steelers head coach Buddy Parker. On November 1, 1966, the NFL awarded the 16th franchise to New Orleans. William G. Helis Jr., Herman Lay, John W. Mecom Jr., Louis J. Roussel Jr., Sanders, and Edgar B. Stern Jr. were the six bidders for the franchise. The New Orleans franchise was awarded to Mecom on December 15, 1966, with his winning bid of $8.5 million.

Head coaching record

College

Notes

References

1917 births
1991 deaths
American football guards
Philadelphia Eagles players
Pittsburgh Steelers players
SMU Mustangs football players
Trinity Tigers football coaches
United States Marine Corps personnel of World War II
Sportspeople from San Antonio
Players of American football from San Antonio
American amputees
American disabled sportspeople
Sportspeople with limb difference